Jacopo Raschi (born 28 April 1998) is Sammarinese footballer who currently plays for Campionato Sammarinese di Calcio club S.S. Virtus and the San Marino national team.

Club career
Raschi has played for Juvenes/Dogana, Cailungo, and Virtus in the Campionato Sammarinese di Calcio. He began the 2021–2022 season with Italian club Polisportiva Stella Rimini before returning to San Marino with S.S. Virtus. He went on to score six goals in thirteen league appearances for the club in the Prima Categoria Emilia–Romagna (VII) that season.

International career
Raschi made a total of eleven appearances for the San Marino U21 team  in  2019 UEFA European Under-21 Championship qualification and 2021 UEFA European Under-21 Championship qualification. He had previously represented San Marino at the under-19 level in 2015 UEFA European Under-19 Championship qualification.

He received his first senior call up in September 2021 for a 2022 FIFA World Cup qualification match away against Albania. He made his senior international debut on 25 March 2022 in a 1–2 friendly defeat to Lithuania at the San Marino Stadium.

International statistics

References

External links
San Marino Football Federation profile

1998 births

Living people
Association football forwards
Sammarinese footballers
San Marino international footballers